Two ships in the United States Navy have been named USS Mayrant for John Mayrant.

 The first  was a modified  launched in 1910, served in World War I and decommissioned in 1920.
 The second  was a  launched in 1938, served in World War II and decommissioned in 1946. She survived the Operation Crossroads atom-bomb tests.

United States Navy ship names